Mesus is a genus of beetles in the family Carabidae, containing the following species:

 Mesus gigas H. Reichardt, 1974
 Mesus hornburgi Dostal, 2016
 Mesus mesus H. Reichardt, 1974
 Mesus nanus H. Reichardt, 1974
 Mesus pseudogigas L. M. Vieira & A. M. Bello, 2004
 Mesus rugatifrons Chevrolat, 1858

References

Scaritinae